John Travers may refer to:

Politicians
 John Travers (Sheriff of London), Sheriff of London 1224–1225
 John Travers (MP), for Lancashire
 John Travers (New South Wales politician) (1866–1943), Australian politician in New South Wales
 John Travers (1867–1928), Australian politician in South Australia
 John Leo Travers (1899–1979), Australian politician in South Australia

Others
 John Travers (actor) (born 1989), Irish film actor
 John Travers (composer) (1703–1758), English composer, Organist to the Chapel Royal
 John Travers (athlete) (born 1991), Irish middle-distance runner
 John Raymond Travers (born 1967), Australian convicted of the 1986 murder of Anita Cobby
 John Travers (priest) (died 1727), Archdeacon of Armagh, 1693